is a 3D action game for the Sony PlayStation. It was developed by Sugar and Rockets and published by Sony Computer Entertainment and released exclusively in Japan in 1999. It is a spin-off game in the Jumping Flash! series. The game makes use of the Sony PocketStation peripheral.  PocketStation is not required to play.

Reception
Famitsu scored the game a 28 out of 40.

References

1999 video games
Action video games
Japan-exclusive video games
PlayStation (console) games
PlayStation (console)-only games
Sony Interactive Entertainment games
Video games developed in Japan
Video game spin-offs